Robert Wickham Anderson (born 2 October 1948) is a former New Zealand cricketer who played nine Test matches and two One Day Internationals for the New Zealand national cricket team between 1976 and 1978. Anderson was born at Christchurch in 1948.

Domestic career
Anderson began his first-class cricket career began in 1967–68 for Canterbury, playing in three Plunket Shield matches for the side during the season. He played for Northern Districts during the 1969–1970 season, including against the touring Australian side before moving to Otago ahead of the 1970–71 season. Anderson played in 35 first-class and 9 List A matches for Otago and was selected for New Zealand whilst at the side. He moved to play for Central Districts in 1977, playing a further 30 first-class and 9 List A matches for the side before retiring after the 1981–82 season. His highest score was 155 for the New Zealand touring team against Scotland in 1978.

Anderson also played Hawke Cup cricket for Southland, Northland and Manawatu between 1970 and 1980. When Southland successfully defended the title against four challenges in 1973–74 he scored 561 runs at an average of 93.50 with three centuries. In the 16 Hawke Cup challenge matches he played, he scored 1,773 runs at an average of 70.92. He was named in the Hawke Cup Team of the Century in 2011.

International career
Anderson played mainly as a top-order batsman. He toured England with New Zealand in 1973 but did not play in any of the international matches on the tour. He made his Test match debut against Pakistan on New Zealand's 1976–77 tour, playing in all three Test matches as well as the sole One Day International (ODI) on the tour. He scored 92 in the opening match, scoring 183 for the fifth wicket in 155 minutes with Mark Burgess, but did not retain his place for the tour of India which followed. He played in all three home Tests against England in 1977–78, and all three on New Zealand's tour to England in 1978 as well as one of the two ODIs on the tour, but scored only 26 Test runs in six innings; Wisden called his performance one of the "biggest disappointments".

Family
His father, Mac Anderson, played one Test match for New Zealand in 1946. Robert's son Tim played for Central Districts as a leg-spinner from 1997–98 to 2002–03.

References

External links
 

1948 births
Living people
New Zealand cricketers
New Zealand Test cricketers
New Zealand One Day International cricketers
Canterbury cricketers
Central Districts cricketers
Northern Districts cricketers
Otago cricketers
Southland cricketers